The 17th Golden Melody Awards were held on 10 June 2006 at the Taipei Arena in Taipei, Taiwan.

Summary
Although alternative musicians were nominated several times for awards, most of the categories were won by mainstream artists. The award ceremony featured South Korean pop singer Se7en as a guest artist. Chinese American rap artist Jin also performed with Taiwanese American singer Leehom Wang for their song titled Heroes of Earth.

The Taipei Times also dubbed the ceremony as having one of the "worst performances to date" due to poorly rehearsed performances by Singaporean artist Stefanie Sun and Hong Kong singer Eason Chan.

Special segments
The mistake made by Karen Mok while presenting the award for Best Male Mandarin Artist at the 16th Golden Melody Awards was revisited with some analysis of the sequence of events.

References

External links
 17th Golden Melody Awards nominees 
 17th Golden Melody Awards winners 
 17th Golden Melody Awards photographs  by The Star via the Associated Press

Golden Melody Awards
Golden Melody Awards
Golden Melody Awards
Golden Melody Awards